Richard Augustus Zimmermann, genre and landscape painter, was born in Zittau in 1820.

Biography
Zimmermann was the son of the impresario Karl Friedrich August Zimmermann, and his three brothers, Albert, Max, and Robert, have all been well-known painters. He was a pupil of the first, and in 1838 followed him to Munich, devoting himself, in opposition to his advice, to landscape painting instead of history. The change, however, proved successful, and his winter landscapes, forest and mountain views, village sketches, and sea pieces became popular. In his later period he adopted the style of Berchem. He retired for a time to Prague, where he worked for a goldsmith. He died after a short illness in 1875.

References

1820 births
1875 deaths
19th-century German painters
19th-century German male artists
German male painters
German genre painters
People from Zittau